Düzqışlaq (also, Dyuzkhshlak, Dyuz-Kyshlag, and Dyuzkyshlak) is a village and the least populous municipality in the Agstafa Rayon of Azerbaijan.  It has a population of 1,075.  The municipality consists of the villages of Düzqışlaq and Kolayır.

References 

Populated places in Aghstafa District